Mt. Roberts is a mountain located in Carroll County, New Hampshire.  The peak is located within the Lakes Region Conservation Trust's Castle in the Clouds property.

See also

 List of mountains in New Hampshire

External links
  Castle in the Clouds
  Mt. Roberts - FranklinSites.com Hiking Guide
 View from the trail to Mt. Roberts

Mountains of New Hampshire
Mountains of Carroll County, New Hampshire